France most commonly records the date using the day-month-year format with an oblique stroke or slash as the separator with numerical values. The 24-hour clock is used to express time, using the letter  as the separator in between hours and minutes.

Date
In France, the all-numeric form for dates is in the order "day month year", using an oblique stroke or slash as the separator. Example: . Years can be written with two or four digits, and numbers may be written with or without leading zero.

The expanded form is "", optionally with the day of the week: "".

The first day of the week in France is Monday.

Time
Example:  (1405 [14:05] hours or 2:05 pm). The minutes are usually written with two digits; the hour numbers can be written with or without leading zero.

Generally speaking, French speakers also use the 24-hour clock when they speak. Sometimes the 12-hour clock is used orally, but only in informal circumstances. Since there is no one-to-one equivalent of "am" and "pm" in French, context must be relied on to figure out which one is meant. To clarify, people may use some sentences like "" (literally "9 o'clock in the morning") or "" (literally "9 o'clock in the evening)... but most French speakers would still find using the 24-hour clock a more convenient way of expressing time clearly.

See also
 French Republican Calendar

Time in France
France